State Highway 21 runs in Coimbatore, Tiruppur of Tamil Nadu, India. It connects the towns of Pollachi and Dharapuram.

Route 
The highway passes through Dharapuram, Mulanur and Kannivadi to a length of 118 km.

Major junctions 

 National Highway 209 (Old numbering) at Pollachi
 State Highway 87 at Gudimangalam
 State Highway 37 and 83A at Dharapuram
 National Highway NH-81 (Old NH-67) near Karur

References

State highways in Tamil Nadu